Blurred Lines is the sixth studio album by American singer-songwriter Robin Thicke. It was first released in Germany on July 12, 2013, and released in the United States on July 30, 2013, by Star Trak Entertainment and Interscope Records. The album features guest appearances from T.I., Pharrell, Kendrick Lamar and 2 Chainz. will.i.am also features as a guest writer on the track "Give It 2 U" and also serves as a producer on the tracks "Feel Good" and "Go Stupid 4 U".

The album debuted at number 1 on both the US and UK albums charts. The album was nominated at the 56th Annual Grammy Awards for Best Pop Vocal Album.

Background
Thicke detailed the album's concept in an interview with The Breakfast Club, "The album is titled Blurred Lines. I've realized as I've gotten older that we all think we're living either in a black or white world, or on a straight path, but most of us are living right in between those straight lines. And everything you thought you knew, the older you get, you realize, 'Damn, I don't know nothing about this. I better pay attention, I better listen and keep learning.' So I think that, that's what I've been realizing these past few years."

Music and lyrics 
Thicke also explained his foray into a more mainstream pop-oriented sound than his usual milieu. "The last year I've been wanting to have more fun. I think I took myself very seriously as an artist and I wanted to be like Marvin Gaye, and John Lennon and Bob Marley and these great artists and songwriters that sang about love and sang about relationships," Robin explained. "And then the last year, my wife and I just really wanted to have fun again, we wanted to be young again and we wanted to dance again and go out with our friends, so I wanted to make music that reflected that culture also."

According to AllMusic, it is an R&B album. Music critic Greg Kot called Blurred Lines a dance-pop album, while Caroline Sullivan of The Guardian characterized its music as upbeat "funk/soul". According to AllMusic's Andy Kellman, it has an array of glossy, pop-oriented dance tracks that deviate from the title track's "disco-funk" style, while other songs such as "Ooo La La" and "For the Rest of My Life" are more rooted in soul. Elias Leight of PopMatters said that the album's first half draws on the luxuriant funk and disco popular in the late 1970s, while the second half is characterized by club-oriented electronic sounds and a few ballads.

Copyright infringement case
In 2014, the family of Marvin Gaye launched a suit against Thicke and Pharrell Williams as well as EMI April – the song publisher now owned by Sony/ATV – claiming similarities between "Blurred Lines" and Gaye's 1977 song "Got to Give It Up". On March 10, the jury found that Thicke and Williams had infringed on the tune, but not rapper T.I., who was also named as a party in the suit. The eight jurors also determined that the infringement was not willful, but also not innocent. The jury awarded the Gaye family $4 million in damages, with profits of more than $1.6 million from Williams and more than $1,760,099 from Thicke. Statutory damages of $9,375 were assessed.

Singles
The album's lead single is the title track "Blurred Lines", released on March 26, 2013. It officially impacted U.S. Rhythmic radio on April 16, 2013 and Top 40/Mainstream radio on May 21, 2013. The video was released on March 20, 2013 and garnered more than a million views in days after release on Vevo. Thicke said he had received the approval of his wife Paula Patton before shooting the video. The single has so far peaked at number 1 on the Billboard Hot R&B/Hip-Hop Songs chart, as well as topping the Billboard R&B Songs chart. It has also become Thicke's most successful song on the US Billboard Hot 100, being his first to reach at number 1 (he previously climbed as high as number 14 with "Lost Without U", back in 2007). The song reached number 1 in Australia, Canada, New Zealand, Ireland, the Netherlands, the United Kingdom, and the United States, as well as the top 10 in Belgium, Denmark, Lithuania, France, Iceland, Italy, Portugal and Switzerland.

The album's second single, "For the Rest of My Life", has impacted urban adult contemporary radio on May 21, 2013 and was released digitally on June 3, 2013.

The album's third single, "Give It 2 U" which features American rapper Kendrick Lamar, was released on July 2, 2013. "Give It 2 U" impacted Top 40/Mainstream radio in the United States on August 27, 2013.

"Feel Good" was released as the album's fourth single. It also has impacted US Top 40 radio on November 12, 2013.

Critical reception

Blurred Lines has received generally mixed reviews from music critics. At Metacritic, which assigns a normalized rating out of 100 to reviews from mainstream critics, the album received an average score of 59, based on 22 reviews. Nick Catucci of Entertainment Weekly found its music predictable and characterized by unadventurous "boutique-lounge grooves." Slant Magazines Andrew Chan felt that, while the album has "an effervescent start", Thicke offers little to contemporary R&B on an album marred by "narcissistic come-ons" and "blunt pronouncements". Caroline Sullivan of The Guardian said that Thicke's "blunt-instrument romantic technique" lacks dignity and keeps Blurred Lines from being "a pretty good album." In her review for The Observer, Hermione Hoby wrote that some of the songs are "passable party pabulum", while Thicke's obnoxious lyrics make the album less entertaining. Greg Kot of the Chicago Tribune said that his distasteful lyrics ruin the music's exciting mood.

In a positive review, Rolling Stone magazine's Rob Tannenbaum called it an optimistic, "near-perfect summer record" that improves over Thicke's previous albums, which he felt were dulled with his "expressions of angst". Annie Zale of The A.V. Club praised Blurred Lines for both its "sincere" songs, including "For the Rest of My Life" and "The Good Life", and for the less introspective songs' "playfulness", which she felt is the album's most appealing quality. In his review for USA Today, Brian Mansfield believed that Thicke's braggadocio improves the tastelessly sexual songs and that the lyrics "may make listeners laugh, wince or even groan, but that doesn't mean they won't get turned on, too." Spin magazine's Keith Harris wrote that Thicke "exaggerates and sings the hell out of" the limitations of his pickup artist character.

Commercial performance
The album debuted at number 1 on the Billboard 200 chart, with first-week sales of 177,000 copies in the United States. The album sold 65,000 copies in its second week, coming in at number 3. In its third week, the album was at number 4, selling 48,000 copies. It sold 46,000 copies in its fourth week, and fell to number 6. In its fifth week, the album sold 55,000 copies and rose to number 5. Blurred Lines  has ranked at number 7 and sold 57,000 copies in its sixth week. As of May 15, 2014, the album has sold 731,000 copies in the United States.

Track listing

Charts

Weekly charts

Year-end charts

Decade-end charts

Certifications

Release history

Notes

  Gaye was not credited as a songwriter, but a court later ruled that the song plagiarized Gaye's song "Got to Give It Up".
  As with most international editions, the UK iTunes edition does not include the track "Go Stupid 4 U", so this edition has the Cave Kings remix of "Blurred Lines" as track 11.

References

2013 albums
Albums produced by Cirkut
Albums produced by Dr. Luke
Albums produced by Jerome "J-Roc" Harmon
Albums produced by Pharrell Williams
Albums produced by Robin Thicke
Albums produced by the Cataracs
Albums produced by Timbaland
Albums produced by will.i.am
Interscope Records albums
Robin Thicke albums
Star Trak Entertainment albums